The 9th Motorized Infantry Brigade is a motorized infantry brigade of the Hellenic Army. Headquartered in Kozani and subordinated to the III Army Corps, it was formed from the former 9th Infantry Division (ΙΧ Μεραρχία Πεζικού) on 1 April 1998.

Structure 
 Brigade Headquarters Company (ΛΣ/9ης ΤΑΞ ΠΖ) at Kozani.
 9th Signals Company (9ος ΛΔΒ)
 9th Engineer Company (9ος ΛΜΧ)
 9th Support Battalion (9ο ΤΥΠ)
 523rd Mechanized Infantry Battalion (523 M/Κ ΤΠ) at Mavrodendri.
 586th Motorized Infantry Battalion (586 Μ/Π ΤΠ) at Grevena.
 106th Self-Propelled Medium Artillery Battalion  (106η Α/Κ ΜΜΠ) at Amyntaio.
 1st Infantry Regiment Tactical Command (ΤΔ/1ου ΣΠ) at Florina.
 15th Infantry Regiment Tactical Command (ΤΔ/15ου ΣΠ) at Kastoria.

1913 establishments in Greece
Infantry brigades of Greece
Military units and formations established in 1913